Przevalski's finch (Urocynchramus pylzowi), Przewalski's finch or Przevalski's pinktail, is an unusual passerine bird endemic to the mountains of central-west China. The species is named after Mikhail Pyltsov, the Russian explorer who accompanied Nikolai Przhevalsky on the expedition in which specimens of the bird were collected. Its taxonomic affinities were unclear for a long time, giving rise to other common names, the pink-tailed bunting and the Przewalski's rosefinch. In 2000 it was proposed that it should in fact be regarded neither as a finch nor a bunting, but as the only member of the family Urocynchramidae, something that had been originally proposed in the German ornithological literature as long ago as 1918 by Janusz von Domaniewski, and also by Wolters in 1979. This change was adopted in the sixth edition of the Clements checklist.

Description and ecology
Przewalski's finch is a small bird similar in appearance to the long-tailed rosefinch. The tail is long and – quite unlike in typical finches – graduated, with the outer feathers much shorter than the central ones. The sexes are dimorphic, with the males having bright pink on the throat, breast and belly. Both sexes have brown streaked plumage on the back and wings. The bill is thinner than those of the rosefinches. The morphological feature which is diagnostic for the Urocynchramidae is the outer primary; in finches and buntings this feather is vestigial but in the Przewalski's finch it is two-thirds the length of the next primary.

Przhevalsky described the species' song as similar to that of buntings. The species has not been studied much in the wild, and little is known of its behaviour. It is not thought to be threatened by human activities and is listed as least concern on the IUCN Red List.

References

External links

Pink-tailed Bunting Don Roberson; Bird Families of the World

Przevalski's finch
Birds of Central China
Endemic birds of China
Przevalski's finch